Women in the Soviet–Afghan War were active in a variety of roles.

Women in the military  
At least 20,000 women were enlisted as support staff by the Soviet military during the War, working in roles such as field nurses, administrators, and military prosecutors. At least 56 Soviet women were killed during the War, however the true number of female casualties is unknown as the Soviet Union did not officially count them. In 2006, the Russian government passed a law declaring civilians who worked in Afghanistan not entitled to war benefits.

The war years saw a number of firsts for women in the Afghan military. In 1983, Khatool Mohammadzai became the first woman from the country to be trained as a paratrooper. However, she was denied combat positions, so she served as an instructor training soldiers for paratroop and commando roles during the war. In 1989, Latifa Nabizada and her sister Laliuma became the first two women pilots to join the Afghan military school in the Afghan Air Force, becoming finally admitted after having been denied admission several times on "medical grounds." Some Afghan women attained prominence for their roles in combat, such as Bibi Ayesha, a female warlord who fought against the Soviet invasion.

A number of women were also involved in the Defense of the Revolution irregular paramilitary and popular militia units created by the Communist government of Afghanistan following the 1978 Saur Revolution, armed by the government and employed to guard sensitive infrastructure and maintain public order. However, almost all mention of the NODR disappeared following the Soviet invasion of Afghanistan in December 1979, possibly as the Soviets considered a loosely accountable body of irregular armed groups to be undesirable during their occupation.

Women rights during the war  
During the war, the Soviet-backed government made a number of attempts to modernise the situation of women's rights in Afghanistan, including granting equal employment rights and mandating education for girls. By 1988, women made up 40 percent of the doctors and 60 percent of the teachers at Kabul University; 440,000 female students were enrolled in different educational institutions and 80,000 more in literacy programs.

The Afghan Women's Council (AWC) was an organization under the Democratic Republic of Afghanistan (1978–87) and the Republic of Afghanistan (between 1987 and 1992), providing social services to women in Afghanistan, fighting against illiteracy, and offering vocational training. Many feared the sacrificing of the AWC in the national reconciliation talks which started in 1987.

However, despite nominal Soviet efforts to advance women's rights during the War, women still faced intense levels of discrimination and violence, including murder of civilians and rape from Soviet troops, and the end of the war and subsequent collapse of the Democratic Republic of Afghanistan led to an intense backlash against women's rights.  According to Aisha Ahmad of the University of Cambridge:Under Communist occupation, wartime rape gained  popularity as a military strategy to repress insurgency... It is perhaps due to the great importance of traditional family honor codes in Afghanistan that wartime rape became a prevalent military strategy during the Soviet-Afghan War, employed to intimidate and terrorize enemy factions. Rape and torture were used specifically against those villages that were suspected to have supported the resistance, and soldiers were reported to have raped women in front of their male relatives. Afghan women, while not active combatants against the Soviets, were also the direct targets of "deliberate and arbitrary killings," persecution, terror tactics, and deprivation, as well as sexual abuse, forced marriage, and prostitution by pro-Soviet militia. According to Amnesty International: "the 20th Century had seen relatively steady progression for women's rights in Afghanistan... But during coups and Soviet occupation in the 1970s, through civil conflict between Mujahideen groups and government forces in the '80s and '90s, and then under Taliban rule, women in Afghanistan had their rights increasingly rolled back."

The Soviet invasion was also not met with support from all women's rights groups. Timothy Nunan of Oxford University has argued that "Soviet and Afghan feminists tried – and largely failed – to communicate with one another at a moment when it appeared possible to create a secular socialist modernity in Afghanistan." The Revolutionary Association of the Women of Afghanistan was founded in 1977 by Meena Keshwar Kamal, an Afghan student activist, and began a campaign against Soviet forces and the Soviet-supported government of Afghanistan after the invasion. Kamal was assassinated in Quetta, Pakistan, in  1987, possibly by the Afghan Intelligence Service KHAD or on the orders of fundamentalist Mujahideen leader Gulbuddin Hekmatyar.

Women refugees often faced significant issues with discrimination, especially as some refugee camps were de facto controlled by fundamentalist Mujahideen. According to Faridullah Bezhan of Monash University, several refugee camps "served as laboratories for Islamic fundamentalists, allowing them to control and segregate women, a practice that they implemented in full when they took over the country in the early 1990s" and that Western aid for refugees tended to emphasise the geopolitics of bringing down the Soviet-backed government, leading to widespread cooperation with fundamentalist Mujahideen. According to Sima Samar, a doctor and refugee during the War who later served as Minister of Women's Affairs of Afghanistan from 2001 to 2003: "For female refugees the living conditions were particularly dire. There was little to no access to basic necessities such as washrooms, medical clinics, and education. The aid that was being distributed was both male and war dominated."

Women of other nationalities 
Joanne Herring, an American socialite and diplomat who had a long association and political relations with the President of Pakistan Zia-ul-Haq during the 1980s, was a leading figure in creating United States support for the Mujahideen during the War.

In 1988, British journalist Christina Lamb was awarded Young Journalist of the Year for her coverage of the Soviet occupation of Afghanistan.

In popular media 
Jeffrey W. Jones of the University of North Carolina at Greensboro has argued that "the representation of women in Zinky Boys: Soviet Voices from the Afghanistan War by Svetlana Alexievich reflects a changing discourse in Soviet society on the war in Afghanistan that helped pave the way for the collapse of the USSR."

See also  
 Women in the Soviet Union
 Women in Afghanistan
 Women in the Russian and Soviet military
 Democratic Republic of Afghanistan

References 

Soviet-Afghan War
Soviet-Afghan War
Soviet-Afghan War
Soviet–Afghan War
History of women in Russia
History of women in Afghanistan